Christina Zwicker (born 17 September 2002) is a Croatian artistic gymnast. She competed at the 2018 and 2019 European Championships. Competed in the 2021 world artistic gymnastics.

Senior competitive history

References

2002 births
Living people
Croatian female artistic gymnasts
Sportspeople from Zagreb